Catechol 2,3-dioxygenase (2,3-pyrocatechase, catechol 2,3-oxygenase, catechol oxygenase, metapyrocatechase, pyrocatechol 2,3-dioxygenase) is an enzyme with systematic name catechol:oxygen 2,3-oxidoreductase (decyclizing). This enzyme catalyses the following chemical reaction

 
 catechol + O2  2-hydroxymuconate semialdehyde

This enzyme contains Fe(II).

References

External links 
 

EC 1.13.11